The 2000 Big League World Series took place from August 6–12 in Tucson, Arizona, United States. Fraser Valley, Canada defeated Jeffersonville, Indiana in the championship game. It was Canada's first Little League championship in any division.

This was the final BLWS held in Tucson.

Teams

Results

United States Pool

International Pool

Elimination Round

References

Big League World Series
Big League World Series